The Revolutionary Workers' Party (POR) is a Spanish far-left group. It was founded in 1974 as the radical Anti-Francoist Revolutionary Workers' Party of Spain (Partido Obrero Revolucionario de España (PORE)), a name that it kept until 1983. This group was mainly active in the Barcelona area. Since 1998, the POR is part of United Left (IU) through the internal group known as Redes.

History
The party was led by Aníbal Ramos (Arturo van den Eynde) for thirty years. Its clandestine phase in Francoist Spain was characterized by ferocious persecution by the Spanish police and the arrest and torture of many of its members. In order to avoid extensive arrests PORE organized itself in tight cells.

The extremism of this group by did not abate after the caudillo's death for PORE steadfastly opposed the Spanish transition to democracy which it saw as a mere continuation of Francoism. It also opposed the reformist policies of the government of Felipe González as well as the government crackdown of the terrorist separatist organisation Basque National Liberation Movement, being one of the first to cry foul during the so-called guerra sucia.PORE was renamed POR in 1983, eight years after the beginning of the political transition. This party keeps decentralized sections only in Catalonia, being part of Esquerra Unida i Alternativa (EUiA) as the Bastida faction. In the Basque Country a sector of POR that was integrated in Ezker Batua-Berdeak (EB-B) through Erabaki abandoned the coalition in 2011 in order to ask the vote for Amaiur;El colectivo Erabaki de EB pedirá el voto para 'Amaiur' en elecciones y reclama la unidad de "toda la izquierda vasca", Europa Press, October 1, 2011. meanwhile another sector kept within EB-B as the Sarea/Redes faction.

Internationally POR is part of the Fourth International. Its main publications are Sin Muro in Spanish and L'Aurora'' (Dawn) in the Catalan language.

See also
POUM

References

External links
POR official site
Partit Obrer Revolucionari (Catalan)
Redes official site

Anti-Francoism
Communist parties in Spain
Far-left politics in Spain
Trotskyist organisations in Spain
United Left (Spain)